Hair Rocket is an indie rock band from Philadelphia, Pennsylvania. Hair Rocket was formed in 2008 by former Aderbat musician Chris Blasucci and produces what it calls "enlightenment through cathartic art". Their slogan is “We cut, We light, and We release”.

Origin
Hair Rocket began as a duo featuring Blasucci on drums and vocals and Dallas Vietty on keys and bass synthesizer, and evolved into a five-piece powerpop band. Following a sabbatical in Mexico City in early 2009, Vietty announced he was leaving the band to pursue a career as an accordionist.

Using Vietty's absence to transform the band, Blasucci rewrote all of Hair Rocket's songs and filmed a music video about a man that decides to elude formal structures and explore an idea. The video, about a man fusing the hair of his lovers to a rocket, became the manifesto of the band.

Ritual
At shows, Hair Rocket asks fans to donate their hair to make a giant rocket clad with a plethora of people's hair. The fans are then invited to meet via the web at an online museum to see their live rocket launched and documented chronologically as a bizarre hermetic experience.

Band members
 Chris Blasucci-guitar, lead vocals
 Todd Mason-drums
 Nawi Avila-bass, vocals
 Louis Sparre-lead guitar
 Allison Lorenzen-vocals, percussion

Discography
In June 2009 Hair Rocket released their debut EP “Novelty” on Mountebank records.

References

Indie rock musical groups from Pennsylvania
Musical groups from Philadelphia
Musical groups established in 2008
2008 establishments in Pennsylvania